Philip William of Neuburg, Elector Palatine (24 November 1615 – 2 September 1690) was Count Palatine of Neuburg from 1653 to 1690, Duke of Jülich and Berg from 1653 to 1679 and Elector of the Palatinate from 1685 to 1690. He was the son of Wolfgang Wilhelm, Count Palatine of Neuburg and Magdalene of Bavaria.

Life 
In 1685, with the death of his Protestant cousin, the Elector Palatine Charles II, Philip William inherited the Electorate of the Palatinate, which thus switched from a Protestant to a Catholic territory. Charles II's sister, now the Duchess of Orléans and Louis XIV's sister-in-law, also claimed the Palatinate. This was the pretext for the French invasion in 1688, which began the Nine Years War.

Marriages
Philip William married twice. He first married Princess Anna Catherine Constance Vasa, daughter of Sigismund III Vasa and Constance of Austria. The couple had a son who died at birth. Anne Catherine Constance herself died in 1651.

In 1653 Philipp Wilhelm married Elisabeth Amalie of Hesse-Darmstadt. This second marriage lasted 37 years and was regarded as extremely happy. They had 17 children, including the next two Palatine Electors, John William and Charles III Philip, as well as Elector-Archbishop Franz Ludwig von Pfalz-Neuburg. Many of these children have descendants today. In the early years of their marriage, the couple lived in Düsseldorf, where they founded churches and monasteries.

Ancestry

External links 

|-

|-

Candidates for the Polish elective throne
House of Wittelsbach
Counts Palatine of Neuburg
People from Neuburg an der Donau
Dukes of Jülich
Dukes of Berg
Prince-electors of the Palatinate
Knights of the Golden Fleece
1615 births
1690 deaths
Burials in Bavaria